This is a list of defunct airlines of Tanzania.

See also
 List of airlines of Tanzania
 List of airports in Tanzania

References

Tanzania
Airlines
Airlines, defunct
Airlines